Bookham may refer to:

Places

Australia
Bookham, New South Wales

United Kingdom

Dorset
Bookham, Dorset
Bookham Knoll, an elevation near Buckland Newton

Surrey
Great Bookham
Bookham railway station
Little Bookham
Bookham Commons
Bookham Lodge, a historic manor house near Stoke d'Abernon

Other uses
Bookham F.C., a football club in Great Bookham, England
Bookham Inc., later Oclaro, an American manufacturer of optical components